Horizon Campus is a leading private university in Sri Lanka

Faculties 
 Faculty of Education
 Faculty of Information Technology
 Faculty of Law
 Faculty of Management
 Faculty of Science
 Faculty of Nursing
 Faculty of Technology

Memberships
Horizon Campus is a member of Association of Commonwealth Universities. It is also an institutional member of the Asia Pacific Quality Network It is a recognised teaching centre of the University of London.

References

Educational institutions established in 2008
Universities and colleges in Colombo
2008 establishments in Sri Lanka
Universities in Sri Lanka